Eucosma dorsisignatana, the triangle-backed eucosma, is a species of moth of the family Tortricidae. It is found in North America, where it has been recorded from Nova Scotia to Florida, west to Texas and north to Manitoba.

The wingspan is 12–22 mm. The forewings are ash grey to brown with faint whitish lines. There is a dark brown patch on the inner margin near the base and a larger paler brown median patch bordered by the costa and the postmedial line. Adults are on wing from July to November.

The larvae feed on the roots of Solidago species.

References

Moths described in 1860
Eucosmini